Telphusa is a genus of moths in the family Gelechiidae.

Species
Telphusa alexandriacella (Chambers, 1872)
Telphusa amphichroma Meyrick, 1913
Telphusa atomatma (Meyrick, 1932)
Telphusa auxoptila Meyrick, 1926
Telphusa barygrapta Meyrick, 1932
Telphusa calathaea Meyrick, 1913
Telphusa callitechna Meyrick, 1914
Telphusa chloroderces Meyrick, 1929
Telphusa cistiflorella (Constant, 1890)
Telphusa conviciata Meyrick, 1929
Telphusa delatrix Meyrick, 1923
Telphusa distictella Forbes, 1931
Telphusa extranea (Walsingham, [1892])
Telphusa fasciella (Chambers, 1872)
Telphusa hemicycla Meyrick, 1932
Telphusa improvida Meyrick, 1926
Telphusa incognitella (Caradja, 1920)
Telphusa iosticta Meyrick, 1937
Telphusa iriditis Meyrick, 1920
Telphusa latebricola Meyrick, 1932
Telphusa longifasciella (Clemens, 1863)
Telphusa medulella Busck, 1914
Telphusa melanoleuca Walsingham, 1911
Telphusa melanozona Meyrick, 1913
Telphusa melitocyela Meyrick, 1935
Telphusa microsperma Meyrick, 1920
Telphusa necromantis Meyrick, 1932
Telphusa nephelaspis Meyrick, 1926
Telphusa nephomicta Meyrick, 1932
Telphusa nigrifasciata Park, 1992
Telphusa nigrimaculata Braun, 1923
Telphusa objecta Meyrick, 1921
Telphusa obligata Busck, 1914
Telphusa ochrifoliata Walsingham, 1911
Telphusa orgilopis Meyrick, 1923
Telphusa penetratrix Meyrick, 1931
Telphusa perspicua (Walsingham, 1897)
Telphusa phaulosema Meyrick, 1920
Telphusa pistaciae Sattler, 1982
Telphusa prasinoleuca (Meyrick, 1921)
Telphusa quercicola Park, 1992
Telphusa quinquedentata (Walsingham, 1911)
Telphusa retecta Meyrick, 1921
Telphusa ripula Walsingham, 1911
Telphusa sarcochroma (Walsingham, 1900)
Telphusa sedulitella (Busck, 1910)
Telphusa semiusta Meyrick, 1922
Telphusa smaragdopis Meyrick, 1926
Telphusa syncratopa Meyrick, 1935
Telphusa syndelta Meyrick, 1921
Telphusa tetragrapta Meyrick, 1937
Telphusa translucida (Walsingham, [1892])
Telphusa xyloptera Meyrick, 1932

References

 
Litini
Moth genera